Datuk Eric Majimbun (born 7 February 1950) was the Member of the Parliament of Malaysia for the Sepanggar constituency in Sabah from 2004 to 2013, as a member of the Sabah Progressive Party (SAPP).

Majimbun was elected to federal Parliament in the 2004 election for the seat of Sepanggar. SAPP was a member of the governing Barisan Nasional coalition until it left in 2008, which Majimbun claimed gave him more freedom to represent his constituents. In the 2013 election, Majimbun contested the Sabah State Legislative Assembly seat of Inanam, but was squeezed into third place behind candidates from the two major national coalitions, the Barisan Nasional and Pakatan Rakyat.

Election results

References

Living people
1950 births
Kadazan-Dusun people
Members of the Dewan Rakyat
Sabah Progressive Party politicians
People from Sabah